The Ghanaian FA Cup, currently known as the MTN FA Cup for sponsorship purposes, is the top knockout tournament of the Ghanaian association football.

The competition is played between the clubs of the Premier League, Division One League, Ghana Division Two League, Ghana Division Three League and GAFCOA. The first G.F.A. Cup competition took place in the season 1957–1958, with an eight years hiatus between the seasons 2002-2010.  Hearts of Oak is the most successful club, having won the competition on 10 occasion, followed by Asante Koko who have won the cup on nine occasions. In 2016, Bechem United defeated Okwawu United 2–1 in the 2016 final.

The current holder is Accra Hearts of Oak, after defeating Ashanti Gold 8–7 on penalties, after a goalless draw in the 2021 FA Cup Final.

Winners

Top performing clubs

See also 

 Ghana Women's FA Cup

References 
 RSSSF

Football competitions in Ghana
National association football cups
Football cup competitions in Ghana
Ghanaian FA Cup